Incheh-ye Sofla (also Romanized as Īncheh-ye Soflá and Īncheh Soflá; also known as Īncheh-ye Pā’īn) is a village in Jeyransu Rural District, in the Central District of Maneh and Samalqan County, North Khorasan Province, Iran. At the 2006 census, its population was 1,503, in 356 families.

References 

Populated places in Maneh and Samalqan County